Janeen is a female given name. Notable women with the given name include:
Janeen Brady (born 1934), American composer, lyricist and publisher of children's music, patriotic songs, educational music and religious songs and hymns
Janeen Brian (born 1948), Australian writer of children's books
Janeen Sollman, American Democratic politician
Janeen Uzzell, American mechanical engineer and business executive
Janeen Webb (born 1951), Australian writer, critic and editor, working mainly in the field of science fiction and fantasy

See also
Janine
Jeanine
Jeannine